Thaddeus Kosciuszko National Memorial, at 301 Pine Street in Philadelphia, Pennsylvania, preserves the home of Tadeusz (Thaddeus) Kościuszko. The life and work of the Polish patriot and hero of the American Revolution are commemorated here.

Kosciuszko returned to the United States in August 1797 to a hero's welcome after his wounding, capture, imprisonment, and banishment from his native Poland, which was partitioned by three neighbouring powers. Kosciuszko's secretary, Julian Ursyn Niemcewicz, having been instructed to find "a dwelling as small, as remote, and as cheap" as possible, chose Mrs. Ann Relf's boarding house at the corner of 3rd and Pine Streets in Society Hill. Here, where Kosciuszko recuperated from his wounds while rarely leaving the house, he was visited by numerous luminaries of the day, including Vice President Thomas Jefferson, architect Benjamin Latrobe, Supreme Court Justice William Paterson, Chief Little Turtle of the Miami people, and Chief Joseph Brant of the Mohawk nation. He returned to Europe the following June to support the restoration of a divided Poland.

The home was listed on the National Register of Historic Places on December 18, 1970.  The National Memorial was authorized on October 21, 1972.  It is administered under Independence National Historical Park but is counted as a separate unit of the National Park System. At  0.02 acre (80 m2), the memorial is America's smallest unit of the National Park System.

The site is currently open for tours, Saturday and Sunday, from 12:00 noon to 4:00 p.m. as of August 2022. No fees, tickets, or reservations are required to visit this site.

See also

List of national memorials of the United States
National Register of Historic Places listings in Center City, Philadelphia

References

External links

Historic house museums in Philadelphia
National Memorials of the United States
Houses on the National Register of Historic Places in Philadelphia
Historic American Buildings Survey in Philadelphia
Polish-American culture in Pennsylvania
Protected areas established in 1972
Biographical museums in Pennsylvania
National Park Service areas in Pennsylvania
Houses completed in 1775
Monuments and memorials in Philadelphia
Independence National Historical Park
Society Hill, Philadelphia
Houses in Philadelphia
National Register of Historic Places in Philadelphia
Monuments and memorials on the National Register of Historic Places in Pennsylvania
Monuments and memorials to Tadeusz Kościuszko
Pennsylvania in the American Revolution
Protected areas of Philadelphia